Peter James Nixon AO (born 22 March 1928) is an Australian former politician and businessman. He served in the House of Representatives from 1961 to 1983, representing the Division of Gippsland as a member of the National Country Party (NCP). He held ministerial office as Minister for the Interior (1967–1971), Shipping and Transport (1971–1972), Postmaster-General (1975), Transport (1975–1979), and Primary Industry (1979–1983).

Nixon is the earliest elected Country MP still alive, and along with Ian Sinclair he is one of the last two surviving ministers who served under Holt and McEwen, as well as in the First Gorton and First Fraser Ministry.

Early life
Nixon grew up on a farming property outside Orbost, Victoria. He was educated at Wesley College, Melbourne. At the age of 18 he sustained a severe injury to his left hip while playing Australian rules football, requiring him to spend eight months in hospital. He passed the time by reading and playing chess. Following his recovery Nixon took up farming, the fourth generation of his family to farm in Gippsland. He had a  property named Macclesfield, where he grew seed beans and maize. He later switched to mixed farming, growing lucerne and keeping dairy cattle. In 1952 he married Jacqueline "Sally" Dahlsen, with whom he had three children.

Politics
Nixon was elected to parliament at the 1961 federal election, following the resignation of George Bowden, the incumbent Country Party MP in Gippsland. He had initially not been a candidate for preselection, agreeing to stand only when the presumed nominee suffered a fatal heart attack three days before nominations closed.

Nixon quickly became a senior member of the Country Party and first entered the ministry as Minister for the Interior in October 1967 before moving to the Shipping and Transport portfolio in 1971 under John Gorton. He retained this portfolio under William McMahon. He is mentioned in the song Gurindji Blues, saying "Buy your land back, Gurindji" referring to his assessment of the Wattie Creek land rights strike.

In opposition from 1972 to 1975, Nixon was a prominent figure in persuading his National Party colleagues to help pass Australian Labor Party legislation opposed by the Nationals' coalition partner, the Liberal Party.  This helped prove to voters the National Party's independence from the Liberal Party and in cases such as when the Nationals supported Labor's policy on educational grants to public schools, helped to show the National Party's connection with core voter issues.  Nixon was also a longtime critic of the Australian Broadcasting Corporation, which he accused of being biased against the National Party.

When Malcolm Fraser became caretaker prime minister and then followed by the Coalition victory in 1975, Nixon served as Minister for Transport until 1979 and then Minister for Primary Industry, both in Malcolm Fraser's government.

On the floor of parliament, Nixon was known for trading insults with opposition members and particularly his verbal stoushes with Fred Daly.

Later life
Following his retirement from politics in 1983, Nixon returned to the business world, including spending seven years from 1984 as a commissioner of the Australian Football League (AFL).  In 1996, he was chosen to chair a joint Commonwealth-State inquiry into the Tasmanian economy.  The report became known as the Nixon Report:  Tasmania into the 21st Century.Trustee of MCC 86–91. Freeman City of Jakarta, Athens.Chief Commissioner East Gippsland Shire 95–97

Honours
On 26 January 1993, Nixon was made an Officer of the Order of Australia for his service to the Australian parliament and to the community.

References

1928 births
Living people
National Party of Australia members of the Parliament of Australia
Members of the Australian House of Representatives for Gippsland
Members of the Australian House of Representatives
Members of the Cabinet of Australia
Officers of the Order of Australia
People from Orbost
20th-century Australian politicians
Government ministers of Australia